Michael J. Moncrief  is an American retired judge and politician who served as the 43rd mayor of Fort Worth, Texas, from 2003 to 2011.

Moncrief started his political career when elected to the Texas Legislature on Nov.3,1970, serving for two years. From 1974 to 1986, he served as judge of the Tarrant County Commissioners Court. 
He was later elected as a State Senator from the 12th district as a Democrat. On May 3, 2003, Moncrief was elected mayor in a non-partisan race. He succeeded Kenneth Barr.  He was re-elected in May 2009 with 70% of the vote.

Moncrief is an alumnus of Tarleton State University in Stephenville, Texas. He served as the first 'Texan Rider,' the mascot of Tarleton State.

Election history
Senate election history of Moncrief from 1992.

Previous elections

2000

1996

1994

1992

References

Year of birth missing (living people)
Living people
Presidents pro tempore of the Texas Senate
Democratic Party Texas state senators
Democratic Party members of the Texas House of Representatives
Mayors of Fort Worth, Texas
County judges in Texas